Enzo Pietropaoli (born in 1955) is an Italian jazz bassist.

In 1987 with the group Lingomania; in 1988 and 1989 with Enrico Pieranunzi Space Jazz Trio; and in 1999, 2001 and 2003 with Doctor 3 group (with pianist Danilo Rea and drummer Fabrizio Sferra).

Discography

As sideman
With Curtis Fuller
Curtis Fuller Meets Roma Jazz Trio (Timeless, 1984)

References

Italian jazz musicians
1955 births
Living people
Italian double-bassists
Male double-bassists
Musicians from Genoa
21st-century double-bassists
21st-century Italian male musicians
Male jazz musicians